Todd Hoffner (born June 17, 1966) is an American football coach and former player.  He is the current head football coach at the Minnesota State University, Mankato, a position he held from 2008 to 2011 and resumed in 2014.  Hoffner was the head football coach at the University of Wisconsin–Eau Claire from 1999 to 2005. He was an assistant football coach at University of Wisconsin–Stevens Point from 1991 to 1998 and served as the offensive coordinator at the University of South Dakota from 2006 to 2007.  Hoffner played college football and ran track at Valley City State University, from which he graduated in 1989.  He is a native of Esmond, North Dakota.

Coaching career
In August 2012 Hoffner was charged by local authorities after a staff member at Minnesota State discovered videos of his naked children on a cell phone that was issued to Hoffner by the university.  Hoffner was removed from his position as head football coach and placed on administrative leave.  The charges were dismissed in December 2012.  The judge who dismissed the charges ruled that the videos of the children amounted to nothing more than them acting silly after a bath.  Hoffner was later fired by Minnesota State.  In January 2014, he was hired by Minot State University to serve as their head football coach.  In April 2014, Hoffner was reinstated in his position at Minnesota State after an arbitrator ruled in his favor.  Minnesota State destroyed notes from its controversial investigation of Hoffner, and the Minnesota legislative auditor’s office meanwhile said it was “surprised” that the school’s investigator, an affirmative action officer, “destroyed her contemporaneous interview notes” when she conducted an investigation for Richard Davenport, the college's president.  The school's investigator conducted flawed interviews in which questioning was not recorded or conducted under oath.

Hoffner received Division II Region 5 Coach of the Year honors in December 2014 from the American Football Coaches Association.  Under Hoffner's guidance in 2014, the Minnesota State University Mavericks won their second consecutive NSIC Championship.

Head coaching record

References

External links
 Minnesota State profile

1966 births
Living people
American football quarterbacks
College football controversies
Minnesota State Mavericks football coaches
South Dakota Coyotes football coaches
Valley City State Vikings football players
Wisconsin–Eau Claire Blugolds football coaches
Wisconsin–Stevens Point Pointers football coaches
College men's track and field athletes in the United States
People from Benson County, North Dakota
Players of American football from North Dakota
People acquitted of sex crimes